Ashtekar variables, which were a new canonical formalism of general relativity, raised new hopes for the canonical quantization of general relativity and eventually led to loop quantum gravity. Smolin and others independently discovered that there exists in fact a Lagrangian formulation of the theory by considering the self-dual formulation of the Tetradic Palatini action principle of general relativity. These proofs were given in terms of spinors. A purely tensorial proof of the new variables in terms of triads was given by Goldberg and in terms of tetrads by Henneaux et al.

The Palatini action 

The Palatini action for general relativity has as its independent variables the tetrad  and a spin connection . Much more details and derivations can be found in the article tetradic Palatini action. The spin connection defines a covariant derivative . The space-time metric is recovered from the tetrad by the formula  We define the `curvature' by

The Palatini action for general relativity reads

where . Variation with respect to the spin connection  implies that the spin connection is determined by the compatibility condition  and hence becomes the usual covariant derivative . Then  is the actual Ricci scalar . Variation with respect to the tetrad gives Einsteins equation

Self-dual variables

(Anti-)self-dual parts of a tensor 

Now, given any anti-symmetric tensor , we define its dual as

The self-dual part of any tensor  is defined as

with the anti-self-dual part defined as

(the appearance of the imaginary unit  is related to the Minkowski signature as we will see below).

Tensor decomposition 

Now given any anti-symmetric tensor , we can decompose it as

Define the projector onto (anti-)self-dual part of any tensor as

The meaning of these projectors can be made explicit.

Then

The Lie bracket 

An important object is the Lie bracket defined by

it appears in the curvature tensor (see the last two terms of Eq. 1), it also defines the algebraic structure. We have the results (proved below):

and

That is the Lie bracket, which defines an algebra, decomposes into two separate independent parts. We write

where  contains only the self-dual (anti-self-dual) elements of

The Self-dual Palatini action 

We define the self-dual part, of the connection  as

which can be more compactly written

Define  as the curvature of the self-dual connection

Using Eq. 2 it is easy to see that the curvature of the self-dual connection is the self-dual part of the curvature of the connection,

The self-dual action is

As the connection is complex we are dealing with complex general relativity and appropriate conditions must be specified to recover the real theory. One can repeat the same calculations done for the Palatini action but now with respect to the self-dual connection . Varying the tetrad field, one obtains a self-dual analog of Einstein's equation:

That the curvature of the self-dual connection is the self-dual part of the curvature of the connection helps to simplify the 3+1 formalism (details of the decomposition into the 3+1 formalism are to be given below). The resulting Hamiltonian formalism resembles that of a Yang-Mills gauge theory (this does not happen with the 3+1 Palatini formalism which basically collapses down to the usual ADM formalism).

Derivation of main results for self-dual variables 

The results of calculations done here can be found in chapter 3 of notes Ashtekar Variables in Classical Relativity. The method of proof follows that given in section II of The Ashtekar Hamiltonian for General Relativity. We need to establish some results for (anti-)self-dual Lorentzian tensors.

Identities for the totally anti-symmetric tensor 

Since  has signature , it follows that

to see this consider,

With this definition one can obtain the following identities,

(the square brackets denote anti-symmetrizing over the indices).

Definition of self-dual tensor 

It follows from Eq. 4 that the square of the duality operator is minus the identity,

The minus sign here is due to the minus sign in Eq. 4, which is in turn due to the Minkowski signature. Had we used Euclidean signature, i.e. , instead there would have been a positive sign. We define  to be self-dual if and only if

(with Euclidean signature the self-duality condition would have been ). Say  is self-dual, write it as a real and imaginary part,

Equating real parts we read off

and so

Important lengthy calculation 

The proof of Eq. 2 in straightforward. We start by deriving an initial result. All the other important formula easily follow from it. From the definition of the Lie bracket and with the use of the basic identity Eq. 3 we have

That gives the formula

Derivation of important results 

Now using Eq.5 in conjunction with  we obtain

So we have

Consider

So we have

Then

where we used Eq. 6 going from the first line to the second line. Similarly we have

by using Eq 7.

Applying this in conjunction with Eq. 8 and Eq. 9 we obtain

From Eq. 10 and Eq. 9 we have

where we have used that any  can be written as a sum of its self-dual and anti-sef-dual parts, i.e. . This implies:

Summary of main results 

Altogether we have,

which is our main result, already stated above as Eq. 2. We also have that any bracket splits as

Derivation of Ashtekar's Formalism from the Self-dual Action 

The proof given here follows that given in lectures by Jorge Pullin

The Palatini action

where the Ricci tensor, is thought of as constructed purely from the connection , not using the frame field. Variation with respect to the tetrad gives Einstein's equations written in terms of the tetrads, but for a Ricci tensor constructed from the connection that has no a priori relationship with the tetrad. Variation with respect to the connection tells us the connection satisfies the usual compatibility condition

This determines the connection in terms of the tetrad and we recover the usual Ricci tensor.

The self-dual action for general relativity is given above.

It has been shown that  is the self-dual part of 

Let  be the projector onto the three surface and define vector fields

Writing

then we can write

So the action can be written

We have . We now define

An internal tensor  is self-dual if and only if

and given the curvature  is self-dual we have

Substituting this into the action (Eq. 12) we have,

where we denoted . Writing , which in this gauge . Therefore,

where we used

This implies

We need

and

to obtain

The action becomes

Integrating by parts on the second term,

where we have thrown away the boundary term and where we used the formula for the covariant derivative on a vector density :

The final form of the action we require is

Hence, we can immediately write

Variation of action with respect to the non-dynamical quantities , that is the time component of the four-connection, the shift function , and lapse function  give the constraints

The connection  can be written

and

where we used

therefore . So the connection reads

This is the so-called chiral spin connection.

Reality conditions 

Because Ashtekar's variables are complex it results in complex general relativity. To recover the real theory one has to impose what are known as the reality conditions. These require that the densitized triad be real and that the real part of the Ashtekar connection equals the compatible spin connection.

More to be said on this, later.

See also
 Lie algebra
Plebanski action
BF model

References

General relativity